Stoj may refer to:

 Stoj., taxonomic author abbreviation for Nikolay Stoyanov (1883–1968), Bulgarian academic and botanist
 Bartłomiej Stój (born 1996), Polish athlete
 Villages in Montenegro:
 Donji Štoj
 Gornji Štoj

See also